Manol Atanassov (born 27 September 1991 in Plovdiv) is a Bulgarian figure skater. He is the 2012 Denkova-Staviski Cup bronze medalist and a two-time Bulgarian national champion. He competed in the final segment at the 2013 European Championships in Zagreb, Croatia.

Atanassov emigrated to the United States at an early age. He started skating in 2003 and began representing Bulgaria in international competition in March 2010, at the 2010 World Junior Championships in The Hague, Netherlands.

Programs

Competitive highlights

References 

http://www.isuresults.com/bios/isufs_pb_00012584.htm

External links 

 
 

Bulgarian male single skaters
1991 births
Living people
Sportspeople from Plovdiv